The Maryland automobile was built by the Sinclair-Scott Company of Baltimore, Maryland, between 1907 and 1910.

History 
Sinclair-Scott was a maker of food canning machinery and in the early 1900s started to make car parts. One of their customers, Ariel, failed to pay and in recompense Sinclair-Scott took over production, moved the factory to Baltimore, and marketed the car as the Maryland.

The car was powered by a 30-hp four-cylinder, overhead camshaft engine. The Ariel design was initially unchanged, and the Maryland was originally available as a four-seat roadster or a five-seat touring car. Limousines became available in 1908 and town cars in 1909. Prices ranged from $2,500 to $3,200,.

Production stopped in 1910 after 871 Marylands had been made, as producing the cars was not profitable. The company returned to the manufacture of food-canning machinery.

References

Defunct motor vehicle manufacturers of the United States
Brass Era vehicles
1900s cars
1910s cars
Motor vehicle manufacturers based in Maryland
Cars introduced in 1907
Vehicle manufacturing companies established in 1907
Vehicle manufacturing companies disestablished in 1910